Sphenophorus cariosus, the nutgrass billbug, is a species of beetle in the family Dryophthoridae. It is found in North America.

References

Further reading

External links

 

Dryophthorinae
Articles created by Qbugbot
Beetles described in 1807